Stade de Frontenex is a football and 400 meter track & field stadium in Geneva, Switzerland. It is the home of UGS Genève and has a capacity of 4,000.

References 
http://www.thefinalball.com/estadio.php?id=5887

Frontenex
Urania Genève Sport